The Chandler River is a  river in Washington County, Maine. It flows from its source on Cottontail Hill in Centerville to Jonesboro, where it empties into Englishman Bay.

See also
List of rivers of Maine

References

Maine Streamflow Data from the USGS
Maine Watershed Data From Environmental Protection Agency

Rivers of Washington County, Maine